Walter Irving "Pard" Pearce (October 23, 1896 – May 24, 1974) was a professional American football player who played quarterback for six seasons for the Decatur Staleys, the Chicago Staleys, the Chicago Bears, the Kenosha Maroons, and the Providence Steam Roller. Pearce was the first starting quarterback for the Bears in team history.

External links
Pard Pearce Bio (Staley Museum)

1896 births
1974 deaths
Players of American football from Providence, Rhode Island
American football halfbacks
American football quarterbacks
Penn Quakers football players
Decatur Staleys players
Chicago Staleys players
Chicago Bears players
Kenosha Maroons players
Providence Steam Roller players
Classical High School alumni